De Pernas pro Ar (Portuguese for Upside Down) is a 2010 Brazilian comedy film directed by Roberto Santucci.

The film had its premiere on December 25, 2010, with official debut on December 31, 2010. Its sequel, De Pernas pro Ar 2, debuted in Brazilian theaters on 28 December 2012.

Plot
Alice is a successful executive in her 30s, married to João, with whom she has a son.  She is a workaholic who tries to balance between work and family routine, but loses her job and husband on the same day.  She attempts to start a new life with the help of her neighbor Marcela, who tries to show that it's possible to be successful at business without foregoing the pleasures of life.  Alice and Marcela become investors in a bankrupt sex shop, while Marcela helps Alice to discover the pleasures of sex toys.

Cast 
 Ingrid Guimarães as Alice Segretto
 Maria Paula as Marcela
 Bruno Garcia as João Luiz Segretto
 Denise Weinberg as Marion
 Antonio Pedro as Sorriso
 Cristina Pereira as Rosa
 Charles Paraventi as Raul
 João Fernandes as Paulinho
 Flávia Alessandra as Danielle Santucci

References

External links
 

2010s sex comedy films
Brazilian comedy films
Pornochanchada
Films directed by Roberto Santucci
Films shot in Paulínia
Films shot in Rio de Janeiro (city)
2010s Portuguese-language films
2010 films